Rif (often styled as /rif) which stands for Rhythm in Freedom, is an Alternative rock band formed in Bandung, Indonesia in 1995.

Considered as one of the best Indonesian rock band, the band is known for their hit singles, such as "Radja", "Bunga", "Si Hebat", "Aku Ingin" and "Loe Toe Ye". Their title "Dunia" also included in original soundtrack of Spider-Man (2002 film). Their song "Bunga" was listed 47th in Rolling Stone Indonesia's 150 best Indonesian songs.

Earlier in 2013, they release a compilation album which consist of new arrangement of their songs from their previous albums and several new songs such as "Party Lagi" and "Aku Tahu Ini Cinta", in the album they also cover two 1980s rock song of Ikang Fawzi ("Preman") dan Anggun C. Sasmi ("Takut feat. Judika").

Band members 
Current
 Restu Triandy ("Andy") – lead vocals, occasional guitars (1985–present)
 Adjie Pamungkas ("Jikun") – lead and rhythm guitars, backing vocals (1985–1991, 1994–present)
 Maggi Trisandi – drums (1994–present)
 Noviar Rachmansyah ("Ovy") – rhythm and lead guitars, backing vocals (2003–present)
 Teddy – bass (2012–present)

Former
 Ardija Hermawan – rhythm guitar (1985–1991); bass (1991–2007)
 Yuke Sampurna – bass (1985–1991)
 Ade – drums (1985–1994)
 Abdee Negara – lead guitar (1991–1992)
 Bambang Sutrisno – bass (1991)
 Dwi – keyboards (1991–1994)
 Abi – rhythm and lead guitars (1991–1993)
 Aria Baron – lead and rhythm guitars (1992–1994; died 2021)
 Denny Rachman – rhythm and lead guitars (1993–2003)
 Marshal Surya Rachman – lead and rhythm guitars (1994)

Timeline

Discography

References

External links 
 Official site
 

Musical groups established in 1995
Indonesian rock music groups
1995 establishments in Indonesia